"Can't Forget You" is a song by Cuban-American singer and songwriter Gloria Estefan. It was released in 1991 as the third single from her second solo album, Into the Light (1991), and at the same time as "Remember Me with Love" in the UK. The single covered almost all the other countries where Estefan released the album, including Australia, Japan, Philippines, Spain, Canada and the United States. "Nayib’s Song (I Am Here for You)" was also released in some European markets as the third official single from the album. The song is much in the style of her earlier songs like "Can't Stay Away from You" or "Don't Wanna Lose You". It peaked at number 43 on the Billboard Hot 100, but reached number two on the Billboard Adult Contemporary chart. No remixes were created for this song. In the UK, "Can't Forget You" was included as a B-side on the single "Go Away", released in 1993.

Charts

Release history

References

1991 singles
Gloria Estefan songs
Pop ballads
Songs written by Jon Secada
1991 songs
1990s ballads
Epic Records singles